Pete Karpuk (c. 1927 – March 4, 1985) was a Canadian football player who played for the Ottawa Rough Riders, Hamilton Tiger-Cats and Montreal Alouettes.

In the last game of the 1951 Big Four regular season, Ulysses Curtis of the Toronto Argonauts had intercepted the ball and had a clear run for a touchdown when Karpuk rushed off the Ottawa Rough Riders bench to tackle him at the Ottawa 24-yard line.
After a 15-minute delay, the referee ruled that Toronto could not be awarded a touchdown or a new play at the 1-yard line, but would have to take their next play from the 12-yard line with a man advantage—a rule that Karpuk knew because he had discussed it in the past.  The tactic was afterwards called "a Karpuk" by at least one commentator when it was used again in American football.

He won the Grey Cup with the Rough Riders that year.

Ten years later he was broke and was sentenced to three months in jail after pleading guilty to stealing $110 from a store; but the conviction was quashed on appeal.

He died of a heart attack in 1985.

References

1920s births
1985 deaths
Canadian football people from Toronto
Players of Canadian football from Ontario
Ottawa Rough Riders players
Montreal Alouettes players
Hamilton Tiger-Cats players